Deh-e Mir Khodayar (also Romanized as Deh-e Mīr Khodāyār) is a village in Pataveh Rural District, Pataveh District, Dana County, Kohgiluyeh and Boyer-Ahmad Province, Iran. At the 2006 census, its population was 28, in 6 families.

References 

Populated places in Dana County